Sierra Totonac is a native American language complex spoken in Puebla and Veracruz, Mexico. One of the Totonacan languages, it is also known as Highland Totonac. The language is best known through the work of the late Herman “Pedro” Aschmann who produced a small dictionary and several academic articles on the language.

Varieties
The varieties of Sierra Totonac are rather diverse, and specialists tend to consider them distinct languages. They are:
Zapotitlán (Zapotitlán de Méndez) Totonac (in Sierra Norte de Puebla)
Coyutla Totonac
Olintla Totonac
Ozelonacaxtla Totonac
Huehuetla Totonac
Coatepec Totonac†
Zapotitlán Totonac is the best known, being the variety described by Aschmann.

See also
 Papantla Totonac

References

Aschmann, Herman P. 1946a. Totonaco Phonemes. International Journal of American Linguistics. 12:34–43. 
Aschmann, Herman P. 1946b. Totonac Categories of Smell. Tlalocan. 2:187–189. 
Aschmann, Herman P. 1948. Cuento del zorro. México: Instituto Lingüístico de Verano. 
Aschmann, Herman P. 1949a. Cuento de la hija del ratón. México: Instituto Lingüístico de Verano. 
Aschmann, Herman P. 1949b. Vocabulario de la lengua totonaca. México: Instituto Lingüístico de Verano. 
Aschmann, Herman P. 1950a. Cuento de la rana y el buey. México: Instituto Lingüístico de Verano. 
Aschmann, Herman P. 1950b. Tres cuentos con moraleja. México: Instituto Lingüístico de Verano. 
Aschmann, Herman P. 1950c. A literal Translation of 2 Corinthians 1:1–11 in Totonac. The Bible Translator. 1:171–179. 
—*Aschmann, Herman P. 1953. Los dos niveles de composición en el verbo totonaco. In Bernal, Ignacio and Hurtado, Eusebio Dávalos, eds. Huastecos, totonacos y sus vecinos. Revista Mexicana de Estudios Antropológicos. 13(2/3):119–122. México: Sociedad Mexicana de Antropología. 
Aschmann, Herman P. 1956. Vocabulario de la lengua totonaca. México: Instituto Lingüístico de Verano y Dirección General de Asuntos Indígenas de la Secretaría de Educación Pública. 
Aschmann, Herman P. 1962. Vocabulario totonaco de la sierra. [Serie de vocabularios indígenas 'Mariano Silva y Aceves', Núm. 7.] México: Instituto Lingüístico de Verano. 
Aschmann, Herman P. 1983 [1962]. Vocabulario totonaco de la sierra. [Serie de vocabularios indígenas 'Mariano Silva y Aceves', Núm. 7.] México: Instituto Lingüístico de Verano. http://www.sil.org/mexico/totonaca/sierra/S007a-VocTotonacoFacs-tos.htm

External links 

 Collections in the Archive of the Indigenous Languages of Latin America

Indigenous languages of Mexico
Totonacan languages